Zum zum zum - La canzone che mi passa per la testa is 1969 film directed by Bruno Corbucci and Sergio Corbucci.

Plot
The sons of a music-loving insurance broker take extreme measures to find happiness for themselves and others, with the help of the power of music.

Sequel
The film was followed by a sequel, Zum zum zum n° 2.

Response 
An Italian review of the time described the film as ”an unpretentious work, whose thin plot is a mere pretext for the songs performed by the protagonists’”.

References

External links

1960s Italian films
1969 films
Italian musical comedy films